Fort Defiance is a historic plantation house located near Lenoir, Caldwell County, North Carolina.  The main block was built between 1788 and 1792, and is a two-story, frame structure measuring 28 feet by 40 feet.  A wing was added in 1823.  It was the home of Revolutionary War General William Lenoir. The property was transferred to the Caldwell County Historical Society in 1965 and operated as a historic house museum.

This location on the Yadkin River was originally built upon by the troops serving under Elijah Isaacs in the summer of 1776. At the time, it was known as Fort Isaacs.

The house was listed on the National Register of Historic Places in 1970.

References

External links
Fort Defiance website

Plantation houses in North Carolina
Historic house museums in North Carolina
Historic American Buildings Survey in North Carolina
Houses on the National Register of Historic Places in North Carolina
Houses completed in 1792
Houses in Caldwell County, North Carolina
National Register of Historic Places in Caldwell County, North Carolina
Museums in Caldwell County, North Carolina